Sieges of Vienna may refer to:

Siege of Vienna (1239)
Siege of Vienna (1276)
Siege of Vienna (1287)
Siege of Vienna (1477), unsuccessful Hungarian attempt during the Austro–Hungarian War.
Siege of Vienna (1485), Hungarian victory during the Austro–Hungarian War.
Siege of Vienna (1490), Habsburg victory during the Austro–Hungarian War.
Siege of Vienna (1529), first Ottoman attempt to conquer Vienna.
Battle of Vienna, 1683, second Ottoman attempt to conquer Vienna.
Capture of Vienna (1805), French occupation during the War of the Third Coalition
Capture of Vienna (1809), French occupation during the War of the Fifth Coalition
Vienna Uprising (1848), Habsburg siege of the city
Vienna Offensive (1945), Soviet offensive.